Plandome is a village in the Town of North Hempstead in Nassau County, on the North Shore of Long Island, in New York, United States. It is considered part of the Greater Manhasset area, which is anchored by Manhasset. The population was 1,349 at the 2010 census. 

The Incorporated Village of Plandome was ranked fifth on Forbes' 10 most affluent U.S. communities list in 2009.

History
The Great Neck and Port Washington Railroad, a subsidiary of the Long Island Rail Road, built what is today known as the Port Washington Branch through the community in 1898; Plandome became a flag stop until it received a station in 1909. The original station building suffered a serious fire in January 1987, and was rebuilt along with platform lengthening and refurbishment by 1990.

The Village of Plandome was incorporated in 1911 as the Plandome Land Company began to develop the village itself, though some homes, farmhouses, and mills had been built in the area in prior decades. Plandome, like the surrounding villages Plandome Manor and Plandome Heights, derives its name from the Latin 'Planus Domus', meaning plain, or level home.

The Willets Farmhouse, circa 1810, is still extant on Willets Lane. It was built by brewer George Willets of the Willets family of Cow Neck. The house was recently restored and is not currently landmarked. The Almeron and Olive Smith House at 50 South Drive is dated to 1907 and was listed on the National Register of Historic Places in 2006.
In the 1990s, the Reconstructionist Synagogue of the North Shore moved to Plandome from Roslyn Estates. 

There remain many historically significant houses belonging to former financiers and industrialists within the village.

Geography 

Plandome is located within the Manhasset Bay Watershed (portions of Plandome also drain to the Leeds Pond sub-watershed of the Manhasset Bay Watershed), and is also located within the larger Long Island Sound/Atlantic Ocean Watershed.

Economy 
Plandome is a bedroom community of the City of New York. As such, a significant number of Roslyn Estates residents commute to/from New York for work.

The village itself is predominantly residential in character, with the heavy majority of lots within the village being zoned for single-family homes. There are no lots zoned for business or commercial uses and as such there are no business districts anywhere within the village.

Demographics

2010 census 
As of the 2010 United States census, there were 1,349 people residing in the village. The racial makeup of the village was 94.74% White, 0.82% African American, 0.07% Native American, 3.63% Asian, 0.22% from other races, and 0.52% from two or more races. Hispanic or Latino of any race were 2.22% of the population.

Census 2000 
As of the census of 2000, there were 1,272 people, 409 households, and 361 families residing in the village. The population density was 2,584.9 people per square mile (1,002.3/km2). There were 422 housing units at an average density of 857.6 per square mile (332.5/km2). The racial makeup of the village was 95.75% White, 0.24% African American, 0.08% Native American, 3.14% Asian, 0.08% from other races, and 0.71% from two or more races. Hispanic or Latino of any race were 2.12% of the population.

There were 409 households, out of which 42.8% had children under the age of 18 living with them, 82.4% were married couples living together, 3.7% had a female householder with no husband present, and 11.7% were non-families. 11.5% of all households were made up of individuals, and 9.0% had someone living alone who was 65 years of age or older. The average household size was 3.08 and the average family size was 3.34.

In the village, the population was spread out, with 30.7% under the age of 18, 5.9% from 18 to 24, 18.2% from 25 to 44, 29.7% from 45 to 64, and 15.4% who were 65 years of age or older. The median age was 42 years. For every 100 females, there were 96.3 males. For every 100 females age 18 and over, there were 90.7 males.

The median income for a household in the village was $192,073, and the median income for a family was $200,000. Males had a median income of $100,000 versus $52,500 for females. The per capita income for the village was $95,102. About 2.8% of families and 4.5% of the population were below the poverty line, including 3.9% of those under age 18 and 2.5% of those age 65 or over.

Government

Village government 
As of February 2022, the Mayor of Plandome is Thomas Minutillo, the Deputy Mayor is Don Richardson, and the Trustees are Dr. Robert Broderick, James Corcoran, Esq., John Kurkjian, and Don Richardson.

Representation in higher government

Town representation 
Plandome is located in the Town of North Hempstead's 6th council district, which as of February 2022 is represented on the North Hempstead Town Council by Mariann Dalimonte (D-Port Washington).

Nassau County representation 
Plandome is located in Nassau County's 9th Legislative district, which as of February 2022 is represented in the Nassau County Legislature by Richard Nicoello (R-New Hyde Park).

New York State representation

New York State Assembly 
Plandome is located within the New York State Assembly's 16th Assembly district, which as of February 2022 is represented by Gina Sillitti (D-Manorhaven).

New York State Senate 
Plandome is located in the New York State Senate's 7th State Senate district, which as of February 2022 is represented in the New York State Senate by Anna Kaplan (D-North Hills).

Federal representation

United States Congress 
Plandome is located in New York's 3rd congressional district, which as of February 2022 is represented in the United States Congress by Tom Suozzi (D-Glen Cove).

United States Senate 
Like the rest of New York, Plandome is represented in the United States Senate by Charles Schumer (D) and Kirsten Gillibrand (D).

Politics 
In the 2016 U.S. presidential election, the majority of Plandome voters voted for Donald Trump (R).

Emergency services

Fire 

Plandome is protected by the Plandome Fire Department, which exclusively serves the village.

Police 
The Plandome Police Department, which exclusively served the village, was absorbed into the Nassau County Police Department in 1975. Police service is now provided by the Nassau County Police Department's Sixth Precinct.

Parks & recreation 

 Plandome Field and Marine Club – a waterfront park adjacent to Manhasset Bay.
 Plandome Village Green – a large green space in the heart of the village. It is also the location of Village Hall, which at one point was used as a school building.
A portion of the private Plandome Country Club is located within the village's boundaries.

Education

School district 
The Village of Plandome is located entirely within the boundaries of the Manhasset Union Free School District. As such, all children who reside within Plandome and attend public schools go to Manhasset's schools.

Library district 
Plandome is located entirely within the boundaries of the Manhasset Library District.

Infrastructure

Transportation

Road 
Major roads in Plandome include Plandome Road and Stonytown Road. The portions of these two roads located within the village are owned and maintained by the village.

Rail 

The Plandome station on the Long Island Rail Road's Port Washington Branch is located within the village. Plandome residents are able to obtain village parking permits in order to park at the station's two village-owned lots.

Bus 
There are no bus routes which run through or directly serve Plandome.

Utilities

Natural gas 
National Grid USA provides natural gas to homes and businesses that are hooked up to natural gas lines in Plandome.

Power 
PSEG Long Island provides power to all homes and businesses within Plandome.

Street lighting 
As of August 2021, Welsbach Electric is Plandome's street lighting contractor.

Sewage 
Plandome is not connected to any sanitary sewer systems. As such, all areas within the village rely on cesspools and septic systems.

Trash collection 
As of August 2021, trash collection services in Plandome are provided by Dejana Industries, under contract with the Village of Plandome.

Water 
Plandome is served by the village-owned and operated Plandome Water System, which exclusively serves and provides the village with water.

Notable people 
 Bruce R. Bent, founder, The Reserve Fund, first money fund.
 Otto Blackwell, Executive for American Telephone & Telegraph. Blackwell lived at 15 North Drive.
 Vernon and Irene Castle (1887–1918, 1893–1969), famous and influential husband-and-wife dance team.
 Arthur G. Elvin, engineer, inventor, and politician who served as one of Plandome's mayors and as the 1st Mayor of Flower Hill.
 Melissa Errico, Broadway actress, songwriter, singer.
 Norman "Boomer" Esiason, NFL quarterback and sports broadcaster.
John Kenneth Galbraith (1908–2006), economist, diplomat and author, and Catherine Galbraith (1913–2008), author.
 Kenny Gardner (1913–2002), singer, Guy Lombardo's Royal Canadians.
 Robert MacCrate (1921–2016), attorney, Partner and Vice Chairman, Sullivan & Cromwell, former President, ABA.
 Samuel L. Mitchill (1764–1831), U.S. Senator, Member U.S. House of Representatives, physician, lawyer and educator.
 Bill O'Reilly, television host, political commentator.
 Bobby Riggs (1918–1995), tennis champion.
 Erika Slezak, Daytime Emmy award-winning actress.
 Jo Spier (1900–1978), Dutch artist and illustrator who emigrated tot the United States.
 Genesta M. Strong (1885–1972), first woman from Nassau County to be elected to the New York State Legislature. Strong was elected in 1944.
 Kenny Williams (1914–1984), television announcer, actor, radio actor.

References

External links 

 Official website

Manhasset, New York
Villages in New York (state)
Villages in Nassau County, New York
Populated coastal places in New York (state)